Nidara multiversa is a moth in the family Drepanidae. It was described by Watson in 1965. It is found in Madagascar.

References

Moths described in 1965
Drepaninae